The 2022 Stu Sells Toronto Tankard was held from September 29 to October 2 at the High Park Club in Toronto, Ontario. The event was held in a triple knockout format with a purse of $40,000 on the men's side and $20,000 on the women's side. It was the first Stu Sells sponsored event held as part of the 2022–23 season.

In the men's event, Sweden's Niklas Edin rink continued their strong play from the 2022 Oslo Cup. After starting with an opening draw loss, the team of Edin, Oskar Eriksson, Rasmus Wranå and Christoffer Sundgren won six straight games to claim the championship title. In the final, they defeated Norway's Magnus Ramsfjell 7–3 with a score of three points in the eighth end. To advance to the final, Edin won 5–4 over Switzerland's Yannick Schwaller in an extra end semifinal while in the other, Ramsfjell defeated Nova Scotia's Travis Colter 5–2. Sam Mooibroek, Joël Retornaz, Tanner Horgan and Yves Stocker all qualified for the playoffs but lost in the quarterfinals.

The women's event final saw Switzerland's Silvana Tirinzoni rink of Tirinzoni, Alina Pätz, Carole Howald and Briar Schwaller-Hürlimann cap off an undefeated weekend with a narrow 6–5 victory over Ontario's Isabelle Ladouceur. This was the second title of the 2022–23 season for Team Tirinzoni as they also won the Summer Series event in August. In the semifinals, the Swiss rink beat South Korea's Kim Eun-jung 6–2 in a rematch of the 2022 World Women's Curling Championship gold medal game while in the other, Team Ladouceur downed Ottawa's Lauren Mann 9–4. Other teams that qualified for the women's playoff round include Hailey Armstrong, Andrea Kelly, Delaney Strouse and Danielle Inglis.

The event featured many international teams such as Edin, Retornaz, Schwaller, Kim and Tirinzoni as it was held the weekend before the 2022 National Grand Slam event.

Men

Teams
The teams are listed as follows:

Knockout brackets

Source:

A event

B event

C event

Knockout results
All draw times are listed in Eastern Time (UTC−04:00).

Draw 1
Thursday, September 29, 8:00 am

Draw 2
Thursday, September 29, 10:30 am

Draw 3
Thursday, September 29, 1:30 pm

Draw 4
Thursday, September 29, 4:00 pm

Draw 5
Thursday, September 29, 7:00 pm

Draw 6
Thursday, September 29, 9:30 pm

Draw 7
Friday, September 30, 8:00 am

Draw 8
Friday, September 30, 10:30 am

Draw 9
Friday, September 30, 1:30 pm

Draw 10
Friday, September 30, 4:00 pm

Draw 11
Friday, September 30, 7:00 pm

Draw 12
Friday, September 30, 9:30 pm

Draw 13
Saturday, October 1, 8:00 am

Draw 14
Saturday, October 1, 10:30 am

Draw 15
Saturday, October 1, 1:30 pm

Draw 16
Saturday, October 1, 4:00 pm

Draw 17
Saturday, October 1, 7:00 pm

Draw 18
Saturday, October 1, 10:00 pm

Playoffs

Quarterfinals
Sunday, October 2, 8:00 am

Semifinals
Sunday, October 2, 2:00 pm

Final
Sunday, October 2, 5:00 pm

Women

Teams
The teams are listed as follows:

Knockout brackets

Source:

A event

B event

C event

Knockout results
All draw times are listed in Eastern Time (UTC−04:00).

Draw 1
Thursday, September 29, 8:00 am

Draw 2
Thursday, September 29, 10:30 am

Draw 3
Thursday, September 29, 1:30 pm

Draw 4
Thursday, September 29, 4:00 pm

Draw 5
Thursday, September 29, 7:00 pm

Draw 6
Thursday, September 29, 9:30 pm

Draw 7
Friday, September 30, 8:00 am

Draw 8
Friday, September 30, 10:30 am

Draw 9
Friday, September 30, 1:30 pm

Draw 10
Friday, September 30, 4:00 pm

Draw 11
Friday, September 30, 7:00 pm

Draw 12
Friday, September 30, 9:30 pm

Draw 13
Saturday, October 1, 8:00 am

Draw 14
Saturday, October 1, 10:30 am

Draw 15
Saturday, October 1, 1:30 pm

Draw 16
Saturday, October 1, 4:00 pm

Draw 17
Saturday, October 1, 7:00 pm

Draw 18
Saturday, October 1, 10:00 pm

Playoffs

Quarterfinals
Sunday, October 2, 11:00 am

Semifinals
Sunday, October 2, 2:00 pm

Final
Sunday, October 2, 5:00 pm

Notes

References

External links
Men's Event
Women's Event

2022 in Canadian curling
Curling in Toronto
September 2022 sports events in Canada
October 2022 sports events in Canada
2022 in Toronto